El Bosque (Spanish for "the forest") is a commune of Chile located in Santiago Province, Santiago Metropolitan Region.

Demographics
The population grew by 1.6% (2,740 persons) between the 1992 and 2002 censuses.

Other statistics
Regional quality of life index: 73.65, medium, 28 out of 52 (2005)
Human Development Index: 0.711, 106 out of 341 (2003)

Administration
As a commune, El Bosque is a third-level administrative division of Chile administered by a municipal council, headed by an alcalde who is directly elected every four years. The 2012-2016 major is Sadi Melo Moya (PS). The communal council has the following members:
 Víctor Downey López (PS)
 Patricia Arriagada Núñez (UDI)
 Margarita Urra Valerio (PC)
 Sebastián Vega Umatino (DC) 
 Manuel Zuñiga Aguilar (PS)
 Luis Morales Ramírez (PPD)
 Aliro Rojas Reyes (PS)
 Roberto Larenas Cuellar (RN)

Within the electoral divisions of Chile, El Bosque is represented in the Chamber of Deputies by Tucapel Jiménez (PPD) and Iván Moreira (UDI) as part of the 27th electoral district, (together with La Cisterna and San Ramón). The commune is represented in the Senate by Soledad Alvear Valenzuela (PDC) and Pablo Longueira Montes (UDI) as part of the 8th senatorial constituency (Santiago-East).

Transportation 
The El Bosque airport is a military airport located in the commune.

References

External links
  Municipality of El Bosque

Populated places in Santiago Province, Chile
Geography of Santiago, Chile
Communes of Chile
1981 establishments in Chile
Populated places established in 1981